Below is a list of notable Trinidadians and Tobagonians, people from Trinidad and Tobago or of Trinidadian and Tobagonian descent.

Notable Trinbagonian nationals
A. N. R. Robinson, President
Ackbar Khan
Adesh Samaroo, singer
Adrian Barath, cricketer
Adrian Cola Rienzi
Albert Gomes
Alfred Mendes
Allan Alvarez (also known as Cheese), speedrunner
Amit Jaggernauth
Anantanand Rambachan
André Tanker
Anisa Mohammed
Annie Dookhan
Anslem Douglas, musician and composer
Anthony Carmona
Anthony Joseph
Anya Ayoung-Chee 
Arnold Rampersad
Ato Boldon, Olympic sprinter
Attila the Hun, calypsonian
Bas Balkissoon
Basdeo Panday, former Prime Minister of Trinidad and Tobago
Bhadase Sagan Maraj
Billy Ocean, singer-songwriter
Black Stalin, calypsonian
Boscoe Holder
Boysie Singh
Brian Lara
Brother Resistance, musician
C. L. R. James
Carl Herrera, basketball player
Céline Gittens
Chalkdust
Charran Kamkaran Singh
Choc'late Allen
Chris Bisson
Cindy Devika Sharma
Crazy, calypsonian
Daisy Voisin
Daren Ganga
Davan Maharaj
David Rudder
Dean Marshall
Denesh Ramdin
Denyse Plummer
Denzil Botus, pianist
Destra Garcia
Devant Maharaj
Dinanath Ramnarine
Dole Chadee (Nankissoon Boodram)
Dominique Jackson, trans right activist, model, Pose star
Donald Ramsamooj
Drupatee Ramgoonai
Dwight Yorke
Earl Lovelace
Eden Shand
Edwin Carrington
Ellie Mannette
Elliott Skinner (anthropologist of Burkina Faso and US Ambassador)
Eric Williams
Errol Duke ("The Growler")
Errol Sitahal
Floella Benjamin
Geoffrey Holder
George Chambers
George 'Sonny' Goddard
Gerry Bednob
Giselle Laronde
Greg Ranjitsingh
Growling Tiger
Gypsy, calypsonian
Haddaway
Haji Gokool Meah
Harold Sonny Ladoo
Hasely Crawford
Hazel Scott
Heather Headley
Hedy Fry
Heeralal Rampartap
Hermat Gangapersad
Hubert Julian
Ian Bishop, cricketer
Ian Hanomansing
Imran N. Hosein
Inshan Ali, cricketer
Ira Mathur
Ishwar Maraj, cricketer
Janelle Commissiong
Jean Pierre; see Netball in Trinidad and Tobago
Jean Ramjohn-Richards
Jennifer Carroll, politician
Jennifer Cassar
Jit Samaroo
Jo-Anne Sewlal, arachnologist
John Agitation
Kamla Persad-Bissessar 
Keith Rowley, primer minister
Kendall Jagdeosingh, footballer
Kenneth Ramchand, academic and writer
Kevin Baldeosingh
Khadeen Carrington (born 1995), Trinidadian-American basketball player for Hapoel Jerusalem of the Israeli Basketball Premier League
Khalid Hassanali
Kimberly Farrah Singh
Krishna Maharaj
Lakshmi Persaud, author
Lakshmi Singh
Lall Ramnath Sawh, urologist
Lancelot Layne
Lauryn Williams
Learie Constantine, Baron Constantine
Lennox Mohammed
Lennox Sharpe
Lionel Belasco, pianist, composer and bandleader
Lloyd Best
Lord Beginner, calypsonian
Lord Creator
Lord Invader
Lord Kitchener, calypsonian
Lord Melody
Lorraine Toussaint, actress
Lovey's String Band
Machel Montano
Mahaboob Ben Ali, businessman
Manny Ramjohn
Marlon Asher, reggae singer
Maximus Dan
Mercedes Carvajal de Arocha, first female elected to the Senate of Venezuela
Michael Ellis Fisher
Michelle Antoine, neuroscientist
Michelle Borel
Mighty Panther
Mighty Shadow
Mighty Sparrow
Mighty Spoiler
Mighty Terror
Mike Bibby
Naomi Chin Wing, fashion model
Neeshan Prabhoo
Neil Bissoondath
Nicholas Pooran
Nicki Minaj
Noor Mohamed Hassanali
PartyNextDoor, musician
Parvati Khan
Patrick Castagne
Patrick Manning
Peter Minshall
Pundit Sahadeo Tiwari
Rabi Maharaj
Rajendra Persaud
Rajindra Dhanraj
Rakesh Yankaran
Ralph de Boissière
Ralph Maraj
Rangy Nanan
Ranji Chandisingh
Ras Shorty I
Ravi Bissambhar
Ravi Rampaul
Rayad Emrit
Raymond Ramcharitar
Reema Harrysingh-Carmona
Ria Carlo (née Persad)
Ria Ramnarine
Rikki Jai
Roaring Lion
Robert Greenidge
Robindra Ramnarine Singh
Rudolph Walker
Rudranath Capildeo
 Sam Boodram
Sam Manning, musician
Sam Mendes
Sampson Nanton
Samuel Badree
Samuel Selvon
Sandra Ramdhanie
Satnarayan Maharaj
Seepersad Naipaul
Shani Mootoo
Sharlene Flores
Shiva Naipaul
Showkat Baksh
Simbhoonath Capildeo
Simone Harris
Sir Lancelot, singer
Solomon Hochoy
Sonny Caldinez
Sonny Ramadhin
Subhashchandra Pandharinath Gupte
Sundar Popo
Sunil Narine
Superblue
Suruj Ragoonath
Surujpat Mathura
Surujrattan Rambachan
The Mad Stuntman
Tony Springer
Tracy Quan
Travis World, DJ & music producer
Trinidad James
V. S. Naipaul
Vahni Capildeo
Valene Maharaj
Valentina Medina
Valiama Narain
Vashtie Kola
Vena Jules
Wendy Fitzwilliam
Wendy Rahamut
Wilmoth Houdini
Winifred Atwell, pianist
Winston Dookeran
Winston Duke
Wintley Phipps
Young Tiger

Notable people of Trinbagonian descent

Affion Crockett, actor, writer, dancer, rapper, comedian, music producer
AJ Tracey
Alfonso Ribeiro
Cardi B
Danny Cipriani
Daymond John
Errol Barrow
Errol Louis
Foxy Brown
Gabrielle Reece
Jadon Sancho
Jessica Sula
Kareem Abdul-Jabbar
Marger Sealey, singer, songwriter, and actress
MF Doom
Nia Long
Nicki Minaj
Roger Gaspard
Ronda Rousey
Roy Hibbert
Sam Mendes
Shari Headley
Sommore
Tatyana Ali
Waheed Alli, Baron Alli
Winston Duke

Notable residents of Trinidad and Tobago
Chris Ofili
Derek Walcott
Peter Doig
Sylvia Kacal
Tubal Uriah Butler

See also
List of people by nationality

References

 Trinidadians